Nectandra citrifolia is a species of plant in the family Lauraceae. It is found in Bolivia and Peru.

References

citrifolia
Vulnerable flora of South America
Taxonomy articles created by Polbot
Trees of Bolivia
Trees of Peru